Reverend Charles Badham (18 July 1813 – 27 February 1884) was an English classical philologist, textual critic, headmaster, and university professor, active in England and even more so in Australia.

Early life
Badham was born at Ludlow, Shropshire, the fourth son of Charles Badham senior, a classical scholar and regius professor of physic at Glasgow; and Margaret Campbell, a cousin of Thomas Campbell, the poet. His elder brother, Rev. Dr Charles David Badham, became a physician and popular writer.

From seven years of age, Badham was sent with his three brothers to Switzerland to study under Johann Pestalozzi. Badham afterwards attended Eton College from about 1826, and in 1830 was elected to a scholarship at Wadham College, Oxford, but only obtained a third class in Classics (1836), a failure which may have been due to the methods of study at Oxford. In 1837 Badham went to Italy, where he occupied himself in the study of ancient manuscripts, in particular those of the Vatican library. Badham afterwards spent some time in Germany, and was incorporated M.A. at Peterhouse, Cambridge, in 1847.

Career
Having taken holy orders, Badham was appointed headmaster of Louth grammar school, Lincolnshire (1851–1854), and subsequently headmaster of Edgbaston proprietary school, near Birmingham. In the interval he had taken the degree of Doctor of Divinity at Cambridge (1852). In 1860 he received the honorary degree of doctor of letters at the University of Leiden. In 1863 was made one of the examiners in classics at London university. In 1866 he was also appointed classical examiner for the Indian civil service.

In 1867 Badham left England to take up the professorship of classics and logic in Sydney University, New South Wales (Australia), arriving in April, which he held until his death. The university had been established some 15 years but had fewer than 40 students. The professor's official duties were not heavy but Badham was not content to laze in a backwater and he even went so far as to write to the leading newspapers in New South Wales offering to correct the exercises of students who might be studying Latin, Greek, French or German, in the country. Some years later he travelled over the country holding meetings and endeavouring to get the people to become interested in the university and to found bursaries for poor students. When the government of New South Wales decided to found a great public library at Sydney, Badham was nominated as a trustee and was elected as the first chairman of trustees. He took the greatest interest in the library, and his wide knowledge was invaluable in its early years. He became the representative man of the university, and his speeches at the annual commencements were eagerly awaited. He always insisted that there must be the same standard of examination for degrees at Sydney as in the leading British universities, and he spared no pains in helping his students to reach that standard.

Late life and legacy
Badham was given a banquet at the town hall, Sydney, in August 1883 to celebrate the completion of his seventieth year, and though his health was then beginning to fail, one of the youngest of those present afterwards recorded that "Badham's speech was unforgettable". On 1 September 1883, in a letter to The Sydney Morning Herald, Badham suggested for the first time that evening lectures should be established at the university. He had been ailing all the year and in December became very ill. He died on 27 February 1884, almost his last act being the writing of a farewell letter in Latin to his old friend C. G. Cobet. He was married twice and left a widow, four sons and four daughters. A selection from his Speeches and Lectures was published at Sydney in 1890, and there is a bursary in his memory at the university. At his funeral the coffin was carried to the grave by former students who had received the bursaries for which he had worked so hard, it was they who subscribed for the monument over his grave, severely simple as he would have desired.

Dr Badham's classical attainments were recognised by the most famous European critics, such as C. G. Cobet, Ludwig Preller, W. Dindorf, F. W. Schneidewin, J. A. F. Meineke, A. Ritschl and Tischendorf; and in Australia, Sir James Martin, William Forster and Sir William Macleay.

Badham published editions of Euripides, Helena and Iphigenia in Tauris (1851), Ion (1851); Plato's Philebus (1855, 1878); Laches and Eutzydemus (1865), Phaedrus (1851), Symposium (1866) and De Platonis Epistolis (1866). He also contributed to classical periodicals such as Mnemosyne. His Adhortatio ad Discipulos Academiae Sydniensis (1869) contains a number of emendations of Thucydides and other classical authors. Badham also published some critiques of Shakespeare. A collected edition of his Speeches and Lectures delivered in Australia (Sydney, 1890) contains a memoir by Thomas Butler.

His oldest daughter with his first wife, Julia Matilda ( Smith), Edith Badham, was the founder of the Sydney Church of England Girls Grammar School.

References

1813 births
1884 deaths
English classical scholars
Alumni of Wadham College, Oxford
Writers from Ludlow
Classical scholars of the University of Sydney
Academic staff of the University of Sydney